The men's 10000 metres at the 2011 IPC Athletics World Championships was held at the QEII Stadium from 22–23 January

Medalists

T54
The Men's 10000 metres, T54 was held on January 22

T54 = normal upper limb function, partial to normal trunk function. May have significant function of the lower limbs.

Results

Final

Splits

See also
List of IPC world records in athletics

References
General
Schedule and results, Official site of the 2011 IPC Athletics World Championships
IPC Athletics Classification Explained, Scottish Disability Sport
Specific

10000 metres
10,000 metres at the World Para Athletics Championships